The 3x3 basketball competition at the 2021 Islamic Solidarity Games was held in Konya, Turkey from 13 to 17 August 2022 in Karatay Congress and Sport Center.

The Games were originally scheduled to take place from 20 to 29 August 2021. In May 2020, the Islamic Solidarity Sports Federation (ISSF), who are responsible for the direction and control of the Islamic Solidarity Games, postponed the games as the 2020 Summer Olympics were postponed to July and August 2021, due to the global COVID-19 pandemic.

Medalists

Medal table

Men

Preliminary round

Group A

Group B

Group C

Group D

Knockout round

Quarterfinals

Semifinals

Bronze medal game

Gold medal game

Women

Preliminary round

Group A

Group B

Group C

Group D

Knockout round

Quarterfinals

Semifinals

Bronze medal match

Gold medal match

References

External links 
Official website

2021
Islamic Solidarity Games
2021 Islamic Solidarity Games
2021 Islamic Solidarity Games